María Leoba Castañeda Rivas, a tenured University Professor in the UNAM Faculty of Law, earned her Master's Degree studying Electoral Institutions and Procedures of the Federal Electoral Institute (IFE), now the National Electoral Institute (INE), in Mexico. She also studied a Specialty at the University of Castilla-La Mancha (Spain). After this, She was awarded an Honorary Doctorate Degree by the Autonomous University of the State of Morelos (Mexico).

She was Director of the Civil Law Seminar at UNAM Faculty of Law. On two occasions, She has been honored by the UNAM with the Felix Pichardo Estrada Outstanding Professor Award; on another two occasions, She was honored with the Rojina Rafael Villegas Outstanding Professor Award. 

Authorship ___

She is President of the General Editorial Board of the UNAM Faculty of Law and member of the editorial board of Accredited Mexican and Foreign Legal Publications.

She is the author of Civil Law in Mexico, Two Centuries of History, published by Editorial Porrúa, and has co-authored several books. For 13 years, She was a member of the Mexican Professional Electoral Service. She has worked as a Researcher for the Center for Economic and Social Studies of the Third World and as Director of the political journal Luz Pública.

References 

Living people
21st-century Mexican lawyers
Academic staff of the National Autonomous University of Mexico
Year of birth missing (living people)
Mexican women lawyers